Yuri Aleksandrovich Bykov (born 11 January 1963) is a Russian professional football manager and a former player.

External links
 

1963 births
People from Nikolsky District, Penza Oblast
Living people
Soviet footballers
Russian footballers
Association football forwards
Russian Premier League players
FC Lokomotiv Moscow players
FC Shinnik Yaroslavl players
FC Asmaral Moscow players
MFC Mykolaiv players
FC Saturn Ramenskoye players
FC Chernomorets Novorossiysk players
PFC CSKA Moscow players
FC Dynamo Bryansk players
Russian football managers
FC Shinnik Yaroslavl managers
Sportspeople from Penza Oblast